King County Metro, officially the King County Metro Transit Department and often shortened to Metro, is the public transit authority of King County, Washington, which includes the city of Seattle. It is the eighth-largest transit bus agency in the United States. Metro employs 2,716 full-time and part-time operators and operates 1,540 buses.

King County Metro formally began operations on January 1, 1973, but can trace its roots to the Seattle Transit System, founded in 1939, and Overlake Transit Service, a private operator founded in 1927 to serve the Eastside. Metro is also contracted to operate and maintain Sound Transit's Central Link light rail line and eight of the agency's Sound Transit Express bus routes along with the Seattle Streetcar lines owned by the City of Seattle. Metro's services include electric trolleybuses in Seattle, RapidRide enhanced buses on six lines, commuter routes along the regional freeway system, dial-a-ride routes, paratransit services, and overnight “owl” bus routes.

History

A horse-drawn streetcar rail system debuted in Seattle in 1884 as the Seattle Street Railway. In 1918, the city of Seattle bought many parts of the Seattle Street Railway, on terms which left the transit operation in financial trouble.

In 1939, a new transportation agency, the Seattle Transit System, was formed, which refinanced the remaining debt and began replacing equipment with "trackless trolleys" (as they were known) and motor buses. The final streetcar ran on April 13, 1941.

The Municipality of Metropolitan Seattle was created by a local referendum on September 9, 1958, as a regional authority tasked with management of wastewater and water quality issues in King County. The authority was formed after civic leaders, including those in the Municipal League, noted that solutions to regional issues were complicated by local boundaries and a plethora of existing special districts. The state legislature approved the formation of a combined transportation, sewage, and planning authority in 1957, but the countywide referendum was rejected by a majority outside of Seattle. Metro, as the authority came to be called, was restricted to sewage management and given a smaller suburban jurisdiction ahead of the successful September referendum. By 1967, the agency had completed its $125 million sewage treatment system, which diverted 20 million gallons ( million liters) that had previously contaminated Lake Washington.

After two failed attempts to enable it to build a regional rapid transit system, it was authorized to operate a regional bus system in 1972. The bus system was known as Metro Transit and began operations on January 1, 1973. Its operations subsumed the Seattle Transit System, formerly under the purview of the City of Seattle and the Metropolitan Transit Corporation, a private company serving suburban cities in King County. In the early 1970s, the private Metropolitan faced bankruptcy because of low ridership. King County voters authorized Metro to buy Metropolitan and operate the county's mass transit bus system. Metro Transit introduced its new services in September 1973, including a ride-free area in downtown and express routes on freeways (known as "Flyer" routes), and a unified numbering scheme in 1977 that replaced named routes.

The Municipality of Metropolitan Seattle was overseen by a federated board of elected officials, composed of elected officials from cities throughout the region. Its representation structure was ruled unconstitutional in 1990 on the grounds of "one person, one vote" following a similar ruling in Board of Estimate of City of New York v. Morris. In 1992, after gaining approval by popular vote, the municipality's roles and authorities were assumed by the government of King County. The municipality's transit operations was a stand-alone department within the county until 1996, when it became a division of the newly created King County Department of Transportation. In August 2018, the county council approved legislation to separate Metro from the Department of Transportation, creating the King County Metro Transit Department effective January 1, 2019.

After completion of the downtown Seattle Transit Tunnel project, attention was drawn again to developing a regional rail system. This interest led to the formation of the Central Puget Sound Regional Transit Authority (more commonly known as Sound Transit) which holds primary responsibility for planning and building high capacity transit in the counties of King, Pierce and Snohomish, in western Washington state.

Today, King County Metro operates more than 200 routes, providing local and regional transit service, primarily within its jurisdictional boundaries. Besides its own transit operations, Metro operates several ST Express bus routes and the Central Link light rail line under a contract with Sound Transit and two streetcar routes under contract with Seattle Streetcar.

Ride Free Area
For almost 40 years, until 2012, most of downtown Seattle was designated as a zero-fare zone, an area in which all rides on Metro vehicles were free, known as the "Ride Free" Area. Intended to encourage transit usage, improve accessibility and encourage downtown shopping, the zone was created in September 1973 and was originally called the "Magic Carpet" zone. It was later renamed the Ride Free Area (RFA). The RFA extended from the north at Battery St. to S. Jackson St. on the south and east at 6th Avenue to the waterfront on the west. Until 1987, the zone was in effect 24 hours a day, but in October of that year Metro began requiring fare payment within the zone during night-time hours, between 9 p.m. and 4 a.m., to reduce fare-related conflicts that sometimes led to assaults on drivers; in February 1994, the RFA's hours were reduced further, with fare payment required between 7 p.m. and 6 a.m.

A King County Auditor's Office report released in September 2009 found that Metro "can neither fully explain nor provide backup documentation for the operating cost savings that offset the fare revenues in the calculation of the annual charges to the City of Seattle for the city’s Ride Free Area" and that some assumptions in the methodology Metro used to calculate the amount of lost fares were "questionable" and have not been updated to reflect changes to the fare structure and fare collection methods.

A 1975 study found that while the Ride Free Area generally reduced bus travel times within the RFA itself, buses that traveled through the Ride Free Area to other destinations generally did not benefit. It also found that unloading outbound coaches once outside the RFA took additional time, though not entirely quantified vis-à-vis time saved within the RFA.

On September 29, 2012, the Ride Free Area was eliminated. All riders boarding in downtown must now pay as they board.

Operations

Routes

Metro has 237 bus routes that combine service patterns typical of both city and suburban bus networks, carrying over 400,000 daily passengers . The city network was descended in large part from the Seattle Transit system of converted streetcar routes. Most service is operated in a hub-and-spoke pattern centered either on downtown Seattle or the University of Washington, with lesser amounts of crosstown service. The suburban network typically operates on major streets between the regions employment and population centers.

Routes in the city network are numbered from 1 to 99. Because of the scattershot evolution of the system, there is no easily discernible pattern to the route numbers, although there are clusters in certain neighborhoods. Suburban routes follow a numbering system: 100–199 for South King County, 200–299 for the Eastside, 300–399 for North King County, and 900–999 for dial-a-ride and custom routes.

The in-city routes with the highest ridership are the RapidRide D Line from downtown to Crown Hill via Uptown/Seattle Center and Ballard; the 7, traveling from downtown through the International District to the Rainier Valley; the 40, traveling from downtown through South Lake Union, Fremont, and Ballard to Northgate; the RapidRide C Line from South Lake Union and downtown to West Seattle's Alaska Junction and Westwood Village; the 36, traveling from downtown through the International District to Beacon Hill; the 5 from downtown via the Woodland Park Zoo and Greenwood/Phinney Ridge to Shoreline Community College; the 44, a crosstown route connecting the University District and Ballard; the 8, a crosstown route connecting Uptown/Seattle Center and South Lake Union with Capitol Hill, the Central District and Mount Baker; and the 70, connecting downtown to South Lake Union, Eastlake, and the University District.

The Metro-operated Seattle Streetcar routes are numbered in the 90s, with the South Lake Union Streetcar numbered 98 and the former bus replacement for the Waterfront Streetcar numbered 99.

The suburban system is more numerically organized. Roughly speaking, areas in South King County (from Burien and Des Moines through Renton and Maple Valley) are served by routes numbered in the 100s, areas in East King County (from Renton to Bothell) are served by routes numbered in the 200s, areas in North King County (from Bothell to Shoreline) are served by routes numbered in the 300s. The Metro-operated Sound Transit Express routes are numbered in the 500s.

Route numbers in the lower 900s (901–931) are used for Dial-a-Ride services, while shuttles connecting to the King County Water Taxi are numbered in the 700s. Since 2003, Metro has contracted with senior charities to operate the Hyde Shuttle system, which provides free rides to elderly or disabled passengers in Seattle and other cities. Metro formerly funded a shuttle system named Ride2 that served West Seattle and Eastgate using contracted private buses, which ended in 2019. A set of three shuttle van services contracted out to private operators, including Via in the Rainier Valley, Community Ride, and Ride Pingo in Kent, were launched starting in 2019. They were merged in 2023 under the "Metro Flex" brand with a shared livery.

Metro is contracted to operate special custom buses. Custom routes that serve schools in Bellevue and on Mercer Island are numbered in the 800s (823, 824, 886–892) and routes serving the private Lakeside School and University Prep numbered in the higher 900s (980–995). Metro also operates custom routes to major employment sites (like Group Health Cooperative in Tukwila and the Boeing Everett Factory). Custom routes are also occasionally established to serve as shuttles for large local events, including Seattle Seahawks and Washington Huskies football games.

Since 2008, Metro has maintained an Emergency Snow Network plan to be implemented during major snowstorms and other periods of inclement weather. The network uses only 67 routes on high-frequency corridors with flat topography to compensate for a reduced number of drivers and workers. Several routes were also split between trunk routes using articulated buses and shuttles to serve hillier areas with smaller buses. The network plan was first implemented during the February 2019 snowstorm. In August 2019, the King County Council voted to waive transit fares during snow emergencies. An earlier plan from the 1980s replaced Seattle–Eastside commuter routes with a set of routes that exclusively served predetermined park and ride lots.

RapidRide

King County Metro operates RapidRide, a network of limited-stop bus lines with some bus rapid transit features. All RapidRide routes have frequent service with frequencies of 10 minutes or better during peak commuting hours and 15 minutes during most off-peak hours and on weekends. Most lines (except the B and F lines) have late night and early morning service. Stops are placed farther apart than typical Metro service to increase speed and reliability. Stops with heavier ridership have "stations" with an awning, seating, lighting, real time information signs to communicate estimate arrival times of RapidRide buses. Most stations and some stops in Downtown Seattle have ORCA card readers that allow passengers to pay before the bus arrives and board at any of the buses' three doors. All lines use new, low-floor, articulated buses that are painted with a distinct red and yellow livery and have onboard Wi-Fi.

The RapidRide corridors are:
 A Line: Tukwila – Federal Way
 B Line: Redmond – Overlake – Bellevue
 C Line: West Seattle – Downtown Seattle – South Lake Union
 D Line: Ballard – Uptown – Downtown Seattle
 E Line: Shoreline – Downtown Seattle
 F Line: Burien – Southcenter – Renton
 H Line: Burien - Westwood Village -  Downtown Seattle starting March 2023

Freeway express services
Metro operates many peak-hour commuter routes serving park and rides that use 244.52 miles of the region's network of High Occupancy Vehicle (HOV) lanes. This practice was pioneered at Seattle Transit as the Blue Streak express bus service running between Northgate Park & Ride and Downtown Seattle. Special stops called "freeway flyers" or freeway stations were constructed to allow efficient transfer between local and express buses. The first freeway flyer stop opened in 1975 at Montlake Boulevard and State Route 520. Metro also takes advantage of new HOV direct-access ramps and freeway stations constructed by Sound Transit to improve speed and reliability of its commuter routes.

Skip-stop spacing
Metro uses skip-stop spacing on 2nd, 3rd, and 4th Avenues in Downtown Seattle, whereby buses skip every other bus stop. On 3rd Avenue, each bus route is assigned to Blue, Yellow, Red or Green stop groups and each bus stop has two color designations; in the northbound direction, every other bus stop is a Red/Yellow or Green/Blue stop, while in the southbound direction they are Green/Yellow and Red/Blue. On 2nd and 4th Avenues, routes are grouped into Orange and White stops. The bus stop color groupings are identified by a colored plate installed above or on the side of the bus stop sign. On 3rd Avenue only, there are additional colored markers one block ahead of each bus stop on the trolley overhead wires, to help bus drivers identify the colors of the upcoming bus stop.

Night Owl services 
Metro operates a network of 12 routes with late-night "Night Owl" service, which is defined as having regular service between midnight and 5 am. The Night Owl network is made up of some of Metro's most popular routes, and is designed to connect neighborhoods with major transportation hubs including downtown Seattle, Sea–Tac Airport, park & ride lots, transit centers, and Link stations (providing service during the hours when trains are not in service). The City of Seattle's transportation benefit district funds service on Night Owl routes that operate entirely within the city limits.

Routes with Night Owl service include the 7, 36, 48, 49, 120, 124, 160, 161, and the RapidRide A, C, D, and E Lines.

Trailhead Direct

King County Metro operates a weekend express shuttle between Seattle and hiking areas in the Cascade foothills called Trailhead Direct from April to October. The service, operated in partnership with the county's park and recreation department and private companies, debuted in 2017 and was expanded the following year to cover three routes: Capitol Hill station to Mount Si; Mount Baker station to the Issaquah Alps; and a shuttle from North Bend to Mailbox Peak. A fourth route, between Tukwila International Boulevard station, Renton, and Cougar Mountain, was added in 2019.

Operating costs
 
The cost per boarding for Metro was $4.10 in 2005, compared to $2.50 among the country's 15 largest transit agencies and $2.97, the national average. Metro's cost per boarding is 38% above the national average.

Metro's higher-than-average cost per boarding can be at least partially attributed to its high percentage of commuter routes, which run at peak hours only, and often only in one direction at a time. As of 2011, 100 of Metro's 223 routes are peak-only. These routes require significant deadheading (particularly on the one-way routes), as well as a very large part-time labor force, both of which drive up costs.

Metro's lowest-cost route overall, route 4 (East Queen Anne to Judkins Park), had a cost per boarding of only $0.46 during peak hours in 2009. By way of contrast, Metro's peak-only route with the lowest cost per boarding was route 206 (Newport Hills to International School), at $2.04. Metro's highest cost route by this measure, route 149 (Renton Transit Center to Black Diamond), had a peak time cost of $34.47 per boarding. Route 149 serves the rural southeastern corner of King County.

In 2007 it cost $3.64 per boarding to deliver service in the West (Seattle) subarea, $4.79 in the South subarea and $7.27 in the East subarea of King County. At the end of 2008, the systemwide cost per boarding was $3.70.

Fares
King County Metro has a flat rate fare structure for all riders. In July 2018, Metro transitioned to a single adult fare of $2.75, eliminating off-peak and zoned fares. ORCA cards can also be used.

Until 2018, King County Metro had two fare zones, dividing Seattle and the rest of the county, and also had a peak surcharge.
Starting September 2022, 18 or younger ride public transportation for free. 

The King County Metro fares as of July 1, 2018 are:

Fare history 
One-way fare (Peak, 1 Zone), with year of rate change:

2018: $2.75 (peak fares discontinued)
2015: $2.75
2012: $2.50
2010: $2.25
2009: $2
2008: $1.75
2001: $1.50 
1998: $1.25
1993: $1.10

1991: $1
1989: 75¢
1985: 65¢
1982: 60¢ (peak fares introduced)
1980: 50¢
1979: 40¢
1977: 30¢
1973: 20¢

Facilities

Downtown Seattle Transit Tunnel 

A major Metro facility is the Downtown Seattle Transit Tunnel (DSTT), a 1.3-mile-long, four-station tunnel that allows Central Link light rail trains to travel under the heart of downtown Seattle. It formerly carried bus traffic alongside light rail trains, stopping at a fifth station in the north and connecting to the SODO Busway in the south.

The tunnel was completed in 1990, at a cost of $455 million, to carry commuter buses. While it was planned from the outset to be convertible to use by trains, the tunnel began operation with a fleet of 236 Breda dual-mode buses that operated using a diesel motor on city streets and an electric motor (with power fed by overhead trolley wire) in the tunnel. In 2004, Metro switched to hybrid-electric buses that operate in a mostly electric "hush mode" while in the tunnel.

The tunnel was closed between fall 2005 and fall 2007 to prepare it for light rail trains. Crews lowered the roadway to match the height of Central Link's low-floor light rail vehicles, replaced the overhead trolley wire with catenary wire, and built a stub tunnel where trains could reverse direction and allowed for construction of the University Link extension to the north (which was completed in 2016). The tunnel finished its retrofit and returned to service on September 24, 2007 and light rail trains began service on July 18, 2009.

Bus service in the tunnel ended on March 23, 2019, as part of the demolition of Convention Place station to prepare for an expansion of the Washington State Convention Center. The project severed access to the north portal of the tunnel, while an upcoming light rail construction project in 2020 will also cause other disruptions. The tunnel is now exclusively used by light rail trains, and its ownership is planned to be transferred to Sound Transit in 2022.

Transit centers
While Downtown Seattle is Metro's main transit hub, transit centers act as smaller regional hubs and are served by many bus routes. Some transit centers also offer a park and ride facility. Metro operates out of several transit centers located throughout King County, some of which are shared with Sound Transit and other county agencies.

Park and ride lots

In King County, Metro has 132 park and ride facilities containing a total of 24,524 parking stalls . Half of the lots are leased from other property owners such as churches.

Metro began developing its park and rides in the 1970s using various funding sources, including federal grants. By 1988, it had 37 lots across King County, mostly concentrated on the Eastside, and monitored property crimes with a team of four police officers and hired guards. In the 1980s, Metro proposed co-locating its park and rides with commercial developments to encourage transit-oriented development and attract more riders. In the 2000s, Metro opened its first park and ride garages as well as several lots that were integrated with housing and retail developments.

Operations bases and facilities 
Metro stores and maintains buses at seven bases (garages), spread throughout its  operating area. In addition to the bases, maintenance of the fleet and operation of the system are supported by several other facilities.

Funding measures

Transit Now
In April 2006, King County Executive Ron Sims announced a program entitled "Transit Now" that, once approved by voters, would provide for a 20 percent increase in transit service by the end of 2016 over 2006 service levels, measured in annual operating hours. In order to realize this growth, Transit Now proposed an increase in the local option sales tax for transit of one-tenth of one percent. The Transit Now ordinance, passed by the King County Council on September 5, 2006, and signed by Executive Sims on September 11, 2006, forwarded the tax proposition to the voters and identified the programs to which operating revenue generated from the sales tax increase could be appropriated. The measure was approved by 56.62% of King County voters in the November 2007 general election. The service programs identified in the ordinance are as follows:

 Implementation of RapidRide routes in five arterial corridors.
 Increase service on high-ridership routes that provide frequent, two-way connections throughout the agency's service area.
 Service for growing areas in outlying suburban/[exurban] areas.
 Partnerships with cities and major employers to provide more service than could otherwise be provided through typical resources.
 Additional improvements such as expanded ride-share and paratransit services in King County.

Proposition 1 
In November 2014, Seattle voters passed Proposition 1 with 59% support. It uses $45 million in new annual funds from a 0.1% sales tax raise and a $60 annual car-tab fee to add King County Metro bus service within the City of Seattle.

Intelligent transportation systems (ITS)
Collaborating with several local jurisdictions, Metro was an early adopter of Transit Signal Priority (TSP), a system that can extend green lights to allow buses to get through. The system can boost average speeds as much as 8% and is in use on several of the city's busiest corridors, including Aurora Avenue North, Rainier Avenue S and Lake City Way NE. The system uses RFID tags that are read as buses approach a TSP equipped intersection. In 1998, the fleet was updated with an Automatic Vehicle Location (AVL) system that utilizes battery-powered beacons that read the RFID tags and communicate the buses' location to Metro.

In 2010, the AVL system was replaced with a GPS-based system as part of a system-wide radio update. As a part of the radio update Metro also added automated next stop signs and announcements to all buses.

In 2010, Metro rolled out a new IP network based ITS infrastructure for its RapidRide service. Buses will communicate with roadside equipment using 802.11 wireless technology on the 4.9 GHz public safety band. A fiber optic backhaul connects access points and roadside equipment together to Metro's Communication Center. The system will extend the legacy RFID-based TSP system. It will also be used in conjunction with GPS technology to provide frequent and accurate location updates for next bus arrival signs at RapidRide stations.

The extent of Metro's application of intelligent transportation systems (ITS) for transit information available for customers has been limited to a few projects: 
 An early project called MyBus by the University of Washington (UW) utilized the tracking data to provide real-time bus information. This is now hosted by Metro under the name Tracker. An improved version of MyBus called OneBusAway, developed by UW graduate students Brian Ferris and Kari Watkins, combines Tracker information with Google Maps. OneBusAway continued to be maintained by the University of Washington Department of Computer Science, until a new nonprofit organization was founded to house and administer it in 2019.
 Transit Watch displays, like those found in airports and major train stations, are installed at some transit centers and transfer points to show real-time bus arrival information.
A pilot project provided bus information displays along a city arterial. Metro discontinued the project in 2005, citing the cost of maintenance and technical problems.
 Metro has a regional trip planner that provides itineraries for transit trips within King, Pierce, and Snohomish counties, including those on Sound Transit services, Washington State Ferries, the Seattle Center Monorail, and the Seattle Streetcar. Google Maps also provides trip planning using schedule data as part of their Google Transit service.

ORCA Card

Metro is a participating agency in the regional smart card program called ORCA (One Regional Card for All). It was launched for public use on April 20, 2009, along with six other transit agencies in the region.

Bus stop technology
RapidRide stations as well as major bus stops in Downtown Seattle are also receiving what Metro calls a "Tech Pylon", a free standing wireless-capable kiosk, that has next bus arrival signs and an ORCA validator for off-board fare payment.

Fleet

As of 2017, King County Metro operates the 10th largest fleet of buses in the United States, with a total of 1,540 buses. The fleet includes a mix of electric trolleybuses, diesel-electric hybrids, and battery electric buses. Buses range in size from  shuttles to articulated buses on higher-demand routes.

In 1978, Metro was the first large transit agency to order high-capacity articulated buses (buses with a rotating joint). Today, King County Metro has one of the largest articulated fleets in North America (second only to MTA New York City Transit) and articulated buses account for about 42% of the agency's fleet.

In 1979, the agency ordered some of the first wheelchair lift equipped coaches in the nation, promising a completely new level of independence for disabled residents. Early lifts were severely flawed, but by the mid-1980s the lifts were generally reliable and were ordered on all new buses. Metro's entire fleet has been wheelchair-accessible since 1999.

Metro was reluctant to adopt low-floor buses, not buying any until 2003. Low-floor coaches have slightly reduced seating capacity (because the wheelwells intrude further into the passenger compartment) which may have been a concern. Whatever the reason for the delay, Metro has now embraced low-floor buses and all new fleet additions since 2003 have been low-floor, with the last high-floor buses retired in 2020.

References

External links

Metro Transit
OneBusAway
Metro Employees Historic Vehicle Association (MEHVA)
Seattle Tunnel on History Link
Metro Tracker Applications
mybus.org
Bus Monster
Central Puget Sound Regional Fare Coordination
Metro/Sound Transit Smart Bus Project
Comparative study between Diesel and GM Hybrid bus fleets operating in Seattle (King County)
Elliott Bay Water Taxi
Why You Should Trust King County Metro Trip Planner

 
Sound Transit
Bus transportation in Washington (state)
Metro
Transit authorities with alternative-fuel vehicles
Transportation in King County, Washington
Transportation in Seattle
Government agencies established in 1973
1973 establishments in Washington (state)
Transit agencies in Washington (state)